The Nicobar shrew or Nicobar white-tailed shrew (Crocidura nicobarica) is a critically endangered species of mammal in the family Soricidae. It is endemic to  Great Nicobar Island in India.

References

Sources
 Chakraborty, S., Pradhan, M.S. & Subramanian, K.A. 2002.  Crocidura nicobarica.   2006 IUCN Red List of Threatened Species.   Downloaded on 30 July 2007.

Crocidura
Endemic fauna of the Nicobar Islands
Mammals of India
Critically endangered fauna of Asia
Mammals described in 1902
Taxonomy articles created by Polbot